Thandan or Thandayan is the honorary title given to the headman of the Thiyya community people in Palakkad, Thrissur district, who reside in the Indian State of Kerala. Thandan is the hereditary headman of a Thiyyar tara (village) and is a Thiyyar by caste. He is appointed by the senior Rani of the Zamorin's family or by a local Raja in territories outside the Zamorin's jurisdiction.
They are designated as Other Backward Classes by the Government of Kerala as per anthropological studies conducted by the Kerala Institute of Research, and Development Studies.

Status
Thandan was the most commonly-used title to represent the highest privilege among the Thiyyar of the Malabar area. The most notable Thiyyar of the Malabars received the title as Thandan for their service to the state either in the administration of Malabar district. The Thandan, the privileged Thiyyar-Karanavar in a  has to carry out the instructions of the politically powerful. He was powerful enough to rule the caste people in his area.

 1. According to Historian A.K.iyer, "Thandan.-Thiyya like the Nayars receive titles from the rulers of the State. That of thandan is purchasable and gives a person the right to be the headman of the caste in his village. He can wear a gold knife and style, may walk before a Nayar with a cloth on his head, ride on a palaquin or a horse, carry a silk umbrella and have a brass lamp borne before him. For each of these privileges he pays separately a tax to the Sircar. Any person using these privileges unauthorised lays himself opeh to a penalty. A Thandan cannot go for cooly work such as ploughing and gathering cocoanuts: Below him there is an inferior officer who is called a Ponamban. Thus in Cochin it is a title pos- Beseed by the headman of the caste, while in the Valluvanad Taluk, the name is applied to a sub-caste. Habits.-Their habits are settled and they are found in all parts of the State. Houses.- The poorer classes of people live in huts with mud walls and thatched roofs, with a room or two and a verandah either in front or all around, while the richer people have their houses like those, of the Nayars".

 2. According to F.Fawcett, "headman of the Tiyans called the " Tandan," comes to the temple followed by two of his caste- men carrying slung on a pole over their shoulders three bunches of young cocoanuts, an appropriate offering, This time there will be loud drumming and a large crowd with the Tandan, and in front of him are men dancing about, imitating sword play with sticks and shields, clanging the shields, palling at bows as if firing off imaginary arrows, the while shouting and yelling madly. The sticks represent swords".

See also

 Caste system in India

References

External links
 Supreme Court Verdict on Thiyya thandan of North kerala and thandan caste of South
 Socio- cultural Study on Thirurangadi
 Parappukavu Temple

Indian castes
Malayali people
Indian surnames
ml:തണ്ടാർ